Maidul Islam Bora (died 4 September 2015) was an Asom Gana Parishad politician from Assam. He was elected in Assam Legislative Assembly election in 1985 and 1996 from Kamalpur. He was minister of sports and youth welfare and food and civil supplies in 1985 and 1996 under the Prafulla Kumar Mahanta- government. His wife Seema Parbin was also Asom Gana Parishad politician. He died in a private hospital in Guwahati on 4 September 2015.

References 

Asom Gana Parishad politicians
State cabinet ministers of Assam
Assam MLAs 1985–1991
Assam MLAs 1996–2001
People from Kamrup district
Year of birth missing
2015 deaths